The 2006 Women's Hockey Champions Trophy was the 14th edition of the Hockey Champions Trophy for women. It was held between 8–16 July 2006 in Amstelveen, Netherlands.

Germany won the tournament for the first time after defeating China 3–2 in the final.

Teams
The participating teams were determined by International Hockey Federation (FIH):

 (Host nation and defending champions)
 (Champions of 2004 Summer Olympics)
 (Champions of 2002 World Cup)
 (Fourth in 2004 Summer Olympics)
 (Fifth in 2004 Summer Olympics)
 (Sixth in 2004 Summer Olympics)

Squads

Head coach: Gabriel Minadeo

Head coach: Frank Murray

Head coach:  Kim Chang-Back

Head coach: Markus Weise

Head coach: Marc Lammers

Head coach: Ian Rutledge

Umpires
Below are the 8 umpires appointed by the International Hockey Federation:

Chieko Akiyama (JPN)
Judy Barnesby (AUS)
Stella Bartlema (NED)
Ute Conen (GER)
Hu Youfang (CHN)
Soledad Iparraguirre (ARG)
Louise Knipe (ENG)
Lee Keum-ju (KOR)

Results
All times are Central European Summer Time (UTC+02:00)

Pool

Classification

Fifth and sixth place

Third and fourth place

Final

Awards

Statistics

Final standings

Goalscorers

References

External links
Official FIH website

Women's Hockey Champions Trophy
Champions Trophy
Hockey Champions Trophy Women
International women's field hockey competitions hosted by the Netherlands
Sports competitions in Amstelveen
Hockey Champions Trophy Women